Knights of the Round Table is a 1953 British adventure historical film made by MGM in England and Ireland. Directed by Richard Thorpe and produced by Pandro S. Berman, it was the first film in CinemaScope made by the studio. The screenplay was by Talbot Jennings, Jan Lustig and Noel Langley from Sir Thomas Malory's Le Morte d'Arthur, first published in 1485 by William Caxton.

The film was the second in an unofficial trilogy made by the same director and producer and starring Robert Taylor, coming between Ivanhoe (1952) and The Adventures of Quentin Durward (1955). All three were made at MGM's British studios at Borehamwood, near London and partly filmed on location. The cast included Robert Taylor as Sir Lancelot, Ava Gardner as Queen Guinevere, Mel Ferrer as King Arthur, Anne Crawford as Morgan Le Fay, Stanley Baker as Modred and Felix Aylmer as Merlin. The film uses the Welsh spelling for Arthur's nemesis, Modred, rather than the more common Mordred.

In addition to the same producer, director and star, the first two films in the trilogy had the same cinematographer (F. A. "Freddie" Young), composer (Miklós Rózsa), art director (Alfred Junge) and costume designer (Roger Furse). The costumes for this film were executed by Elizabeth Haffenden. In 1955, she would take over from Furse as costume designer for the final film in the trilogy, Quentin Durward. Alfred Junge remained as art director.

Plot
With the land in anarchy, warring overlords Arthur Pendragon and his half-sister Morgan LeFay meet as arranged by the sorcerer Merlin to discuss how to end the bloodshed. Merlin leads them to Excalibur, a sword embedded in an anvil and says that according to legend, whoever can remove the sword shall be King of England. Arthur removes the sword easily. Morgan's lover Modred accuses Merlin of witchcraft and a hearing is arranged with the Council of Kings at the Ring of Stones. The next spring, Arthur goes to war against Modred and wins, earning him the crown.

French knight Sir Lancelot rescues Arthur's fiancée Guinevere from being kidnapped by a mysterious knight. After Arthur and Guinevere's wedding, Lancelot pledges his allegiance. Arthur swears to join the select group of knights at the Round Table and England enjoys a period of peace and prosperity. During this time, Lancelot rides north to defend England's border with Scotland and Sir Percival goes in search of the Holy Grail.

Morgan and Modred continue to harbor ill feelings against Arthur, and note with interest the growing warmth between Lancelot and Guinevere. Modred calls a meeting of Arthur's enemies in Scotland and urges them to make peace so that Lancelot will be exposed as Guinevere's lover.

Late one night, jealous after seeing Lancelot kiss another woman, Guinevere goes to his rooms, and Modred's men soon arrive to arrest them for high treason. Lancelot and Guinevere are tried in absentia at the Round Table and declared guilty. Lancelot walks in and surrenders, and when he confesses his chaste love for Guinevere, Arthur revokes their death sentence. Outraged, Modred turns the other knights against Arthur, and civil war returns to the land. A truce is agreed but ends abruptly when a knight draws his sword to dispatch a snake.

Arthur is mortally wounded in battle. With his dying breath, Arthur commands Lancelot to destroy Modred and give Guinevere his love and forgiveness.

Plot notes
In this film, Arthur's half-sister Morgan LeFay is portrayed as Modred's mother. In most legends Modred's mother is Morgause, another of King Arthur's half-sisters. Morgan LeFay is more widely recognized as the mother of Sir Ywain (or Owain) of the Round Table.

Also, Percival is said to be brother of Elaine of Corbenic (Lancelot's wife), but this relationship is not found in Arthurian literature.

Cast

 Robert Taylor as Lancelot
 Ava Gardner as Guinevere
 Mel Ferrer as King Arthur 
 Anne Crawford as Morgan Le Fay 
 Stanley Baker as Modred
 Felix Aylmer as Merlin 
 Maureen Swanson as Elaine
 Gabriel Woolf as Percival 
 Anthony Forwood as Gareth 
 Robert Urquhart as Gawaine 
 Niall MacGinnis as Green Knight
 Ann Hanslip as Nan
 Jill Clifford as Bronwyn
 Stephen Vercoe as Agravaine
 Howard Marion-Crawford as Simon *
 John Brooking as Bedivere *
 Peter Gawthorne as Bishop * 
 Alan Tilverne as Steward *
 John Sherman as Lambert *
 Dana Wynter as Morgan Le Fay's servant [as Dagmar Wunter] *
 Mary Germaine as Brigid *
 Martin Wyldeck as John *
 Barry MacKay as Green Knight's first squire *
 Derek Tansley as Green Knight's second squire *
 Roy Russell as Leogrance *
 Gwendoline Evans as Enid *
 Michel de Lutry as Dancer *

All names with an asterisk (*) are credited on the "Cast" page (p62) of Knights of the Round Table: A Story of King Arthur - Text based on the Metro-Goldwyn-Mayer film (Ward, Lock • London and Melbourne) [1954]

Cast notes
Some performers - the first two here appearing in several scenes and with several lines to speak - were uncredited. These include: Ralph Truman as King Marr of the Picts, Henry Oscar as King Mark of Cornwall, Desmond Llewelyn as a herald, and Patricia Owens as Lady Vivien. Valentine Dyall spoke the opening narration.

Production
The film had some sequences shot near Tintagel Castle, Cornwall, with local people as extras. Scenes for the first battle were shot at Luttrellstown Castle Estate in Co. Dublin, Ireland. Woodland scenes and the hawking scenes were shot at Ashridge Forest, Herts. The Torquilstone Castle set designed by Alfred Junge for Ivanhoe (1952) was expanded and re-dressed as Camelot. Most of the indoor filming was at MGM-British Studios, Borehamwood, Herts.

George Sanders was originally cast as Modred but fell ill prior to shooting and was replaced by Stanley Baker, who had just made an impression in The Cruel Sea (1953).

The film was apparently shot on Eastmancolor stock, like Quentin Durward (1955), but it was advertised only as being 'in COLOR magnificence'. The film itself credits no color process. IMDb attributes the prints to Technicolor's laboratory, but it is not listed as one of the corporation's film prints in Fred E Basten's book Glorious Technicolor.

Production was interrupted by labor disputes when two hundred extras (all members of the British extras' union) struck, demanding a pay increase. After a month-long strike that affected other productions, MGM finally agreed to meet the union's demands.

MGM was sued for $5 million for plagiarism in 1956 with a claim that the film was based on a script submitted to them in the 1930s. The judge ruled that both the film and the earlier script were based on Le Morte d'Arthur and Alfred, Lord Tennyson's Idylls of the King and rejected the claim.

Film reception

Box office
According to MGM records, the film earned $4,518,000 in the US and Canada and $3,578,000 elsewhere, resulting in a profit of $1,641,000.

According to Kinematograph Weekly the film was a "money maker" at the British box office in 1954.

Responses
Review aggregator Rotten Tomatoes reports that 67% of six surveyed critics gave Knights of the Round Table a positive review; the average rating was 6/10.

Moreover, Knights of the Round Table has received mixed reviews from the majority of critics. Bosley Crowther of The New York Times found Knights of the Round Table to be a refreshing, enjoyable film that resembled "a spectacular, richly costumed Western film", stating that the new CinemaScope technology brought the film to life. Decent Films Guide reviewer Steven D. Greydanus gave the film a "B", writing that "a solid adaptation of the King Arthur legend, Knights of the Round Table benefits from its colorful pageantry and strongly Christian milieu, including a royal Catholic wedding and a transcendent moment of revelation involving the Holy Grail".

Awards and nominations
Knights of the Round Table was nominated for two Academy Awards for Best Art Direction-Set Decoration, Color (Alfred Junge, Hans Peters, John Jarvis) and Sound Recording (A. W. Watkins). It was also nominated for the Grand Prix at the 1954 Cannes Film Festival.

Bibliography
Knights of the Round Table: A Story of King Arthur - Text based on the Metro-Goldwyn-Mayer CinemaScope film (Ward, Lock • London and Melbourne) [1954]

Both the crew and cast credits published at the front (crew) and back (cast) of the book are much fuller than those in the U.S. prints. They appear to come from variant U.K. prints prepared for British cinemas. It's known that contractual obligations required that Miklos Rozsa's score had to be recorded in England (by the London Symphony Orchestra conducted by Muir Mathieson) as well as being recorded in Hollywood by Rozsa himself. This version of the score may have been used in British prints. Currently only a U.S. print is available on DVD.

Comic book adaptation
 Dell Four Color #540 (March 1954). Full-color photo-cover • 34 pages, 33 in full-color • Drawn by Dick Rockwell • Copyright 1954 by Loew's Incorporated [Authorised movie tie-in]

References

External links
 
 
 
 
 

1953 films
1953 adventure films
British historical adventure films
1950s English-language films
Metro-Goldwyn-Mayer films
Films directed by Richard Thorpe
Films scored by Miklós Rózsa
Films adapted into comics
Films set in castles
Films set in England
Films shot in England
Films shot in Hertfordshire
Films with screenplays by Noel Langley
CinemaScope films
Films shot at MGM-British Studios
1950s British films